This is a list of mayors of Bruges.

See also
 Timeline of Bruges

Bruges
History of Bruges